Edward Ferdinand Jacob Lindberg (November 9, 1886 – February 16, 1978) was an American Olympic athlete, winner of the gold medal in 4 × 400 m relay at the 1912 Summer Olympics. He was born in Cherokee, Iowa and died in Highland Park, Illinois.

Lindberg won the AAU championships in 440 yd in 1909 and 1911. At the Stockholm Olympics, Lindberg won the bronze medal in 400 m and ran the second leg in the American 4 × 400 m relay team, which won the gold medal with a new world record of 3.16.6. At the same Olympics he competed in the baseball event which was held as demonstration sport.

References

1886 births
1978 deaths
American male sprinters
Baseball players from Iowa
Olympic baseball players of the United States
Athletes (track and field) at the 1912 Summer Olympics
Baseball players at the 1912 Summer Olympics
Olympic gold medalists for the United States in track and field
Olympic bronze medalists for the United States in track and field
World record setters in athletics (track and field)
American people of Swedish descent
People from Cherokee, Iowa
Track and field athletes from Iowa
Medalists at the 1912 Summer Olympics